Karel Kašpar (born 6 April 1952) is a Czechoslovak boxer. He competed in the men's lightweight event at the 1972 Summer Olympics.

References

1952 births
Living people
Czechoslovak male boxers
Olympic boxers of Czechoslovakia
Boxers at the 1972 Summer Olympics
Place of birth missing (living people)
Lightweight boxers